The Best-of-7 2013 Korean Series began on Tuesday, October 24, at the Daegu Baseball Stadium in Daegu, South Korea. It featured the Samsung Lions, who had claimed homefield advantage by finishing in first place at the end of the regular season, and the Doosan Bears, who finished second during the regular season and defeated the LG Twins in a best-of-5 playoff series (3 games to 2) to advance to the Finals. The Samsung Lions won the series in seven games to collect their fifth Korean Series championship.

Roster
Samsung Lions

Doosan Bears

Summary

Matchups

{| width="220" class="wikitable"
|-
!2013 Korean Series Champion
|- align="center"
|Samsung Lions(Seventh title)
|}

References

Korean Series
Korean Series
Korean Series
Samsung Lions
Doosan Bears